Vankal is an area located in Surat District, India.

See also 
List of tourist attractions in Surat

Suburban area of Surat
Neighbourhoods in Surat